Guy Paul Joseph Sparrow (born November 2, 1932), nicknamed "The Bird", is a former American National Basketball Association player. He was drafted in 1955 with the fifth pick in the third round by the New York Knicks. In his first season with the Knicks, Guy averaged 11.1 points and 6.4 rebounds per game. During his second NBA season, Guy was traded to the Philadelphia Warriors for Jack George. In his second season, Guy averaged 5.0 points and 3.6 rebounds per game. In Guy's final NBA season, he averaged 2.7 points per game and 2.1 rebounds a game for the Warriors.

Early life
Due to a rheumatic ailment at around age 13, Sparrow's legs were disabled. His parents had to carry him to and from school. He walked on braces when he entered Pontiac High School in Pontiac, Michigan. He was able to recover and play for the basketball team. He later played on the basketball team of the University of Detroit.

References

External links
 Guy Sparrow @ TheDraftReview

1932 births
Living people
American men's basketball players
Basketball players from Michigan
Detroit Mercy Titans men's basketball players
Forwards (basketball)
New York Knicks draft picks
New York Knicks players
Philadelphia Warriors players
Scranton Miners (basketball) players
Sportspeople from Pontiac, Michigan